Henryk Stroband (1548–1609) was a Polish jurist and mayor of Toruń. He founded the Protestant Academic Gymnasium in Toruń, and was partially responsible for the codification of Kulm law in Toruń.

Bibliography 
 Janusz Małłek, Henryk Stroband (1548-1609). Reformator i współtwórca Gimnazjum Akademickiego w Toruniu, "Echa Przeszłości", T. XI, 2010, s. 63-68.

1548 births
1609 deaths
Polish jurists
People from Toruń